The 1946 Bradley Braves football team was an American football team that represented Bradley University as an independent during the 1946 college football season. In their 24th season under head coach Alfred J. Robertson, the Braves compiled a 7–2 record and outscored opponents by a total of 173 to 105.

Bradley ranked 13th nationally among small-college teams with an average of 262.7 yards per game in total offense.

In the fall of 1946, Bradley had record enrollment of 2,893 full-time undergraduate students with another 2,000 people enrolled in special divisions.

Schedule

References

Bradley
Bradley Braves football seasons
Bradley Braves football